Why We Sleep: The New Science of Sleep and Dreams (or simply known as Why We Sleep) is a 2017 popular science book about sleep written by Matthew Walker, an English scientist and the director of the Center for Human Sleep Science at the University of California, Berkeley, who specializes in neuroscience and psychology. In the book, Walker discusses about the importance of sleeping, the side effects of failing to do so and its impact on society.

Walker spent four years writing the book, in which he asserts that sleep deprivation is linked to numerous fatal diseases, including dementia.

Why We Sleep has gone on to become a bestseller under The New York Times and The Sunday Times that questions its namesake from the viewpoint of neuroscience. The book has received generally positive reviews from critics, who praised Walker's research and views on the science of sleep, while criticizing the book for its certain claims regarding sleep.

Background 
According to Walker, who had never written a book at the time, he was motivated to write the book after an encounter with a woman who peeked at his work related to sleep and its benefits for health, with the woman stating, "When that comes out, I want to read it". Walker described this encounter as a sincere "independent ratification" that made him write the book. The book took Walker roughly four and a half years to write.  Walker and his team spent roughly 20 years studying the rejuvenating ability sleep has, to much avail. Walker's communication style, in which he makes use of "metaphors and analogies effectively," allowed him to explain ideas related to sleep in detail.

At 18 years of age, Walker, who was a medical student at the time, became an "accidental sleep researcher" and moved over to studying neuroscience because of his habit of asking many questions. It was during his PhD at London's Medical Research Council when Walker learned about how little information there was on sleep. A scientific paper helped Walker with his research after his failure to determine the differences of brainwave activity between various dementia found in people, with the paper's contents describing the areas of the brain each variant of dementia attacks. It was then Walker realized that in order to measure his patients' brainwave patterns properly, they need to be asleep. Walker spent six months teaching himself how to set up his sleep laboratory, which allowed him to voice his findings on sleep differences amongst his patients.

Walker noted that many people misinterpret the amount of sleep they actually receive, likely caused by deep thought during the light sleep phases. Following the release of the book, Walker went on to describe his book has having the potential to make readers sleep and jokingly admitted to being concerned to hear if his book kept people awake at night.

Contents 
The book is written from a neuroscientific view and is mainly devoted to discussing about the impact sleep has on the functions of the human brain. The book is divided into four parts, each section focusing on how sleep works, its benefits, the reason why dreams occur and sleep issues surrounding society. The book is written in a way so that it does not need to be read sequentially.  In the book, Walker discusses about the effects of the widespread effect of sleep-loss, in which the goal in mind being that readers will endeavour in achieving eight hours of sleep once they learn about the connection sleep loss has to other health issues, such as Alzheimer's disease. Other details about lack of sleep explained by Walker include adults who sleep for less than 6 hours at the age of 40 and above have a higher chance of suffering a cardiac arrest or a stroke during their lifetime.

"Sleep pressure and circadian rhythms", the driving forces and the framework of sleep, are brought up by Walker in the book. Other sleep behaviors, such as non-rapid eye movement sleep and rapid eye movement sleep, and the impact sleep has on "synaptic pruning" and the creation of memories during a human's lifespan are also covered.  NREM and REM are further explained by Walker to be the two sleeping basics, with 5 cycles present in a person's good night sleep. The book mentions about "morning types" and "evening types" of people, with Walker writing about how spending fewer amounts of time sleeping benefited earlier human predecessors who slept in groups of people due to their time period being safer than now.

The book emphasises on the significance of having a good night's sleep without the feeling of uneasiness or guilt of laziness. Walker, in his book, defines insomnia as a disorder that usually related to an overwrought commiserating nervous system that's usually caused by anxiousness. He goes on to addresses the P.T.S.D victims' nightmares, stating that their dreams' ability to heal them by reducing the emotions connected to a distressing memory is affected by an unusual quantity of noradrenaline being created. Walker also believed that dreams carry information regarding fundamental emotions while admitting that they can be quite apparent to people, resulting in no explanations required to describe them.

The values of sleep and the consequences of sleep deprivation are also brought up in the book. One particular research conducted in the past, where people volunteered themselves to sleep for only six hours in a span of 10 nights, is brought up by Walker. This resulted in the volunteers being "cognitively impaired" along with their brains being heavily damaged, regardless of the three week eight-hour sleep schedule they received later. Actions carried out by sleep-deprived people, such as answering emails at every hour of a day, are brought to question in the book. Walker wrote that research proves that sleeping after studying allows for "memory, integration and retention benefits" to occur. He further wrote that sleeping has the ability to retain memories and amend the abilities of human learning. Many organizations, who make creativeness, productiveness and resilient workers valued, give themselves a "sleep bonus", with the amount of extra sleep received being determined through electronic monitoring. Walker further noted that companies are changing their workplaces by allowing more "flexible working" and comfort zones for people to rest.

Walker's research on what impacts sleep is brought up in the book, with temperature influencing sleep being one of them. A five-step guideline is written in the book, with Walker explaining how to prevent "self-euthanasia" from missing sleep. The guideline also brings up "individual-level transformation" and a reformation of society. The book teaches about the basics behind how sleep works neurologically and biologically. The impact of caffeine on sleep is written in the book, with Walker noting its effects on the adenosine that allows people to fall asleep. It is further explained that caffeine will take more time to exit the body as it ages, with younger people having the ability to break caffeine down at a fast pace.

Walker wrote the book in a "reader-friendly" in areas such as discussing about neuroscientific techniques and how they were created. The book ends with Walker's advice for better sleep through 12 tips, with one of the tips written in the book being to have an eight-to-nine-hour period of sleep.

Critical reception
Why We Sleep has garnered a generally positive reception from critics, with Walker admitting to not knowing his book would be a hit amongst readers. The book would go on to make Walker famous in his field of expertise. The book became an international bestseller, including a #1 on the Sunday Times Bestseller in the UK, and a #8 on the New York Times Bestseller. It received numerous other reviews, including the Guardian, BBC, NPR, Financial Times, UC Berkeley and Kirkus Reviews. Critics praised the book for Walker's convincing studies on the importance of sleep and its impact on society.

Seithikurippu R. Pandi-Perumal praised Walker's structuring of the book, calling it informative, organised and intelligibly written while noting its informative yet reader-friendly nature. In a review from Bill Gates, he noted that the book teaches about the importance of sleeping, despite some points in the book not being convincing. He also noted that the book aided him in sleeping better, pointing out that it took a longer time to finish the book as he followed Walker's word on putting the book down to go to sleep. Kylie O'Brien's review described the book as "beautifully written" and filled with scientific facts that clarifies the question its title asks.

A review by Christopher Torrens in The Physiological Society described the book as informative and helpful, noting the book's evidence related to the consequences of having little to no sleep. He praised the book's style and formatting of being able to be read "from cover to cover or by cherry-picking chapters in whatever order you choose". A review by Joy Richards described the book as "tremendously terrifying" and unforgettable. Ruth Armstrong wrote that the book was loaded with recent research towards sleep, noting the change in his sleeping patterns.

Criticism surrounding the book involved the book telling stories about sleep instead of explaining facts about it. A review from Alexey Guzey, an independent researcher, criticized the book in an essay entitled Matthew Walker's "Why We Sleep" Is Riddled with Scientific and Factual Errors. The criticism was discussed on the BBC series More and Less. Guzey's criticism was also discussed by Andrew Gelman, a statistician at Columbia University. In a later post on Columbia's statistics blog, Gelman indicated that Walker's purported removal of a bar from a graph could be a "smoking gun," commenting that it entered "research misconduct" territory.

The book's failure to answer its own title 'Why We Sleep' has been criticised, with renowned sleep researcher William Dement commenting that people only need sleep due to the sleepiness accumulated. Anu Valtonen found fault in the book naming neuroscience as "the science that provides the knowledge of sleep and dreams" and its overlooking of other disciplinary areas related to sleep. She also criticised the book for lacking certain information on sleep, such as the "social aspects" of sleep or "socio-historical" route of sleep hygiene. Rosa Breed criticised Walker's lack of references when writing the book, noting that there was no proof in certain statements made by him, such as Walker's suggestion of sleeping for eight hours as a necessity. Jonathan Hawken felt that some of the book's contents were rather selective, criticising the book's lack of in-depth analysis towards the effect of sleep apnea.

Controversies 
The book has spawned controversy related to Walker's belief that the amount of sleep received worldwide has decreased. A researcher on sleep, Jim Horne, disagreed with the idea regarding how people are weighed down by a lack of sleep and that everybody was required to sleep for at least eight hours. Bill Gates wrote that he disagreed with Walker's claim that sleep and Alzheimer's disease have a strong connection to each other. Anu Valtonen voiced her concern regarding the speculation the book makes when taking a neuroscientific stance on the main insights into how sleep and dreams function.

Some critics felt that Walker's way of writing made the book feel similar to a horror story. Rosa Breed felt that some ideas brought up by Walker in the book were thought to be disturbing, noting Walker's suggestion for having people's sleeping behaviours be measured by "health insurance companies" to be prying. Some of Walker's claims were based on laboratory studies without supporting real-world evidence, making them questionable to critics.

References

External links
 

Popular science books
Sleep
Neuroscience books
2017 non-fiction books